The counties of Sweden (Swedish: Sveriges län) are the top-level geographic subdivisions of Sweden. Sweden is today divided into 21 counties; however, the number of counties has varied over time, due to territorial gains/losses and to divisions and/or mergers of existing counties. This level of administrative unit was first established in the 1634 Instrument of Government on Lord Chancellor Count Axel Oxenstierna's initiative, and superseded the historical provinces of Sweden in order to introduce a more efficient administration of the realm. At that time, they were what the translation of län into English literally means: fiefdoms. The county borders often follow the provincial borders, but the Crown often chose to make slight relocations to suit its purposes.

In every county there is a county administrative board (länsstyrelse) headed by a governor (landshövding), appointed by the government, as well as a separate regional council (region). In the county of Gotland however, the county's only municipality has adopted regional responsibilities. 

The aims of the county administrative board are to supervise local state administration (that is not otherwise assigned to other government agencies), and to coordinate political goals with the central government. The regional council is the elected regional political assembly that oversees the municipal affairs of the county, primarily in regard to public healthcare, public transport, and culture.

Several other government agencies are organised on a county basis, including the main bodies of the police, employment, social insurance, and forestry services.

List of counties

Map 
With county codes, which were official until 1974.

AB: Stockholm County
AC: Västerbotten County
BD: Norrbotten County
C: Uppsala County
D: Södermanland County
E: Östergötland County
F: Jönköping County
G: Kronoberg County
H: Kalmar County
I: Gotland County
K: Blekinge County
M: Skåne County
N: Halland County
O: Västra Götaland County
S: Värmland County
T: Örebro County
U: Västmanland County
W: Dalarna County
X: Gävleborg County
Y: Västernorrland County
Z: Jämtland County

Each county region contains a number of municipalities, the existence of which is partly at the discretion of the central government. Since 2004 their number has been 290, thus an average of 13.8 municipalities per county.

Until 1968, the City of Stockholm had its own "county code" A, which is still used interchangeably with AB in some contexts, and County of Stockholm had county code B. L was for Kristianstad County and M was for Malmöhus County but since they were merged to form Skåne County, M is usually used. O used to stand for Gothenburg and Bohus County but has been used for Västra Götaland County since it was merged with Skaraborg County (R) and Älvsborg County (P).

History

Older subdivisions 
Sweden's provinces, or landskap, and the "lands", or landsdelar, lack political importance today but are common denominations culturally and historically. The provinces had their own laws and justice systems and could have large cultural and religious differences. Note that the province of Småland (literally small land) historically was several provinces with its own laws. Here burial tradition in the era before the Viking Age could differ significantly from province to province. The province of Norrbotten is a relatively recent creation; it was part of Västerbotten which extended all the way to Österbotten into today's Finland before 1809. Finnish and Swedish Lappland was also one province until 1809.

Historically, the provinces were grouped in three lands: Götaland, being southern and western Sweden; Svealand being eastern and south-eastern, and Norrland being the entire northern half. The names of the first two refer to ancient tribes, and the third is a geographical reference. They are still commonly used as geographical references. The boundaries have changed over time, with the most significant in 1658 (the cession of provinces from Denmark-Norway to Sweden) and 1812 (due to the loss of Finland to Russia in 1809). In 1812 some provinces were moved from Götaland to Svealand.

Finland 
After the Finnish War, Sweden was forced to cede the counties in Finland to Russia following the Treaty of Fredrikshamn in (1809). However, the counties were upheld in Finland until a reform in 1997. They are still in use in Sweden, 370 years later.

The counties in Finland established in 1634 were: Turku and Pori County, Nyland and Tavastehus County, Viborg and Nyslott County, Ostrobothnia County and Kexholm County. Over time the number of subdivisions in Finland increased to twelve, until a reorganization in 1997 reduced their number to six provinces, while keeping the administrative model intact. The counties in Finland were abolished in 2010.

Abolished counties 
Abolished counties in current-day Sweden proper were:

 Skaraborg County + Gothenburg and Bohus County + Älvsborg County (merged as Västra Götaland County in 1998)
 Kopparberg County (became Dalarna County in 1997)
 Malmöhus County + Kristianstad County (merged as Skåne County in 1997)
 Norrland County (in 1645 divided into Västerbotten County, Hudiksvall County and Härnösand County)
 Nyköping County, Gripsholm County and Eskilstunahus County (united in 1683 to become Södermanland County)
 Närke County (became Örebro County)
 Härnösand County (1645–1654, formed Västernorrland County)
 Hudiksvall County (1645–1654, formed Gävleborg County)
 Office of the Governor of Stockholm (1634–1967, united with Stockholm County)
 Svartsjö County (1786–1809, united with Stockholm County)
 Öland County (1819–1826, united with Kalmar County)

Counties in Swedish-ruled Finland were: 

 Turku and Pori County (1634–1809)
 Nyland and Tavastehus County (1634–1809)
 Ostrobothnia County (1634–1775)
 Viborg and Nyslott County (1634–1721)
 Kexholm County (1634–1721)
 Kymmenegård and Nyslott County (1721–1747)
 Savolax and Kymmenegård County (1747–1775)
 Vasa County (1775–1809)
 Oulu County (1775–1809)
 Kymmenegård County (1775–1809)
 Savolax and Karelia County (1775–1809)

Proposed regions 

Under the aegis of the Swedish government, Ansvarskommittén has been investigating the possibilities of merging the current 21 counties into 6 to 9 larger regions. These proposals are from their final report, delivered in 2007:

 Norra Sverige: Norrbotten County + Västerbotten County + Jämtland County + Västernorrland County + Nordanstig and Hudiksvall
 Bergslagen: the rest of Gävleborg County + Dalarna County + Örebro County + Värmland County
 Mälardalen: Stockholm County + Uppsala County + Södermanland County + Västmanland County + Gotland County
 Västra Götaland: Västra Götaland County + Halland County
 Östra Götaland: Östergötland County + Jönköping County + Kronoberg County + Kalmar County
 Södra Götaland: Skåne County + Blekinge County

 Norra Sverige: Norrbotten County + Västerbotten County + Örnsköldsvik
 Mellannorrland: Jämtland County + Västernorrland County (except Örnsköldsvik) + Nordanstig and Hudiksvall
 Dalarna-Gävleborg: Dalarna County + Gävleborg County (except Nordanstig and Hudiksvall)
 Västra Svealand: Värmland County + Örebro County
 Mälardalen: Stockholm County + Uppsala County + Södermanland County + Västmanland County + Gotland County
 Västra Götaland: Västra Götaland County + Halland County
 Östergötland: Östergötland County + Västervik
 Småland: Jönköping County + Kronoberg County + Kalmar County (except Västervik)
 Södra Götaland: Skåne County + Blekinge County

A model for this comes from the merger of some counties into Skåne County and Västra Götaland County in 1997 and 1998, respectively, which is now considered a success.

The counties are discussing the proposal. An obstacle is that Stockholm County does not want to merge with any other county, while its neighbours want to merge with Stockholm.
After this discussion the following proposal has in 2016 emerged:
 Norrbotten, Västerbotten, Västernorrland and Jämtland county
 Dalarna, Gävleborgs, Södermanlands, Uppsala, Västmanland and Örebro county
 Östergötland, Jönköping, Kalmar and Kronoberg county
 Gotland and Stockholm county
 Halland, Värmland and Västra Götaland county
 Blekinge and Skåne county
The main difference is that the proposed Bergslagen is divided to other counties, and Stockholm is on its own (plus the small Gotland which has air connections to Stockholm)

Riksområden 

The counties in Sweden correspond to the third level of division in the European Union's system of Nomenclature of Territorial Units for Statistics. For the purpose of creating regions corresponding to the second level, counties have been grouped into eight Riksområden, or National Areas: Stockholm, East Middle Sweden, North Middle Sweden, Middle Norrland, Upper Norrland, Småland and the islands, West Sweden and South Sweden.

See also 
Administrative divisions of Sweden
Ranked list of Swedish counties
ISO 3166-2 codes for Sweden
Subdivisions of the Nordic countries

References

External links 

The Swedish County administrative boards
Official site of the Swedish government
National Atlas of Sweden (searchable)

 
Subdivisions of Sweden
Counties
Sweden 1
Counties, Sweden
Sweden geography-related lists